Nangelil Ayurveda Medical  College is an ayurvedic medical college, located in Kothamangalam, in the Ernakulam district of Kerala, India. The college, owned by the Nangelil Charitable Trust, is self-financing, and is affiliated to Kerala University Of Health Sciences, Thrissur and associated with Nangelil Ayurveda Medical College Hospital, Kothamangalam.

The college offers a five-year Bachelor of Ayurvedic Medicine And Surgery course, approved by Kerala University of Health science, Trichur. 60 seats are available for this course. The admission is partly from the Kerala State Medical Entrance.

References

External links
 Nangelil Ayurvedic Treatment Centre

Ayurvedic colleges in Kerala
Medical colleges in Kochi
Colleges affiliated with the Kerala University of Health Sciences
Universities and colleges in Ernakulam district